The Pages Rock Light was a lighthouse located in the York River in the Chesapeake Bay.

History
This light was constructed in 1893, a late date for a screw-pile structure. The hexagonal house was prefabricated at Lazaretto Point in Baltimore and apparently had an unexciting career before its removal in 1967 as part of the general program of decommissioning screw pile lights in the bay.

References

Pages Rock Light, from the Chesapeake Chapter of the United States Lighthouse Society

Lighthouses in Virginia
Lighthouses completed in 1893
Houses completed in 1893
Lighthouses in the Chesapeake Bay